Lorena Bućan, known professionally as simply Lorena, is a Croatian singer. Bućan rose to fame in 2018 after finishing third on the second season of Zvijezde. She has signed a contract with record label Tonika Records where she primarily collaborates with musician Tonči Huljić. She has released several successful singles with the label, including "Tower of Babylon", which also served as the Croatia's entry for the 2019 Eurovision Song Contest, "Tihi ocean", "Tvoja i gotovo" and "Kad si ti u pitanju" among others.

Early life
Bućan was born in Split, Croatia in 2002 by Croatian father and Croatian mother.

Music career

2019-today: Early years and first singles
On 17 January 2019, Bućan was announced as one of the 16 participants in Dora 2019, the national contest in Croatia to select the country's Eurovision Song Contest entry, with the song "Tower of Babylon". She performed 14th and finished second with a total of 18 points. A few months later, in July 2019, Bućan performed her song "Kad si ti u pitanju" at the 59 Split Festival. On 21 November 2019, Bućan was revealed as one of the performers on the 67th Zagreb Festival. She performed the song "Tihi ocean" written by Ivan Huljić and Vjekoslava Huljić. On 23 December 2019, Bućan was announced as one of the 16 participants in Dora 2020, the national contest in Croatia to select the country's Eurovision Song Contest 2020 entry, with the song "Drowning". On 10 August 2020, Lorena released another single titled "Kako samo mater zna" written by the Huljić duo. The music video for the song was directed by Vojan Koceić from production studio Pilot Studio and shows the singer, dressed in red walking next to the beach scenery in Split. She promoted the song by a performance at the 60 Split Festival where she received three awards, including Golden Wave, first award from the jury and the journal award for best interpretation. Her performance at the show was seen as its highlight for its strong and convincing interpretation.

In 2020, Lorena released a single titled "Tvoja i gotovo" written and produced by Vjekoslava and Tonči Huljić which gained popularity with the public. As of 2022, it has more than 3 million views on YouTube and was given the 'Cesarica' award in the category for September hit. In 2022, she sang a short snippet of the song with Jelena Rozga which was very well-received by fans on Instagram. On 22 November 2022, Lorena released her new song "Boli", an uptempo song with a more modern twist, written and produced by Tonči and Vjekoslava Huljić. The single was promoted on Radio Dalmacija the same day along with a music video released on YouTube directed by Vojan Koceić. The song was well-received by her fanbase and other listeners.

Artistry
Due to her high vocal register and versatile capabilities, critics compared Lorena to Doris Dragović. Despite seeing that as a compliment, she shared with the public that she would not like to be called a "successor" to some singers. Her mentor and main collaborator Tonči Huljić also complimented her for the use of emotions in her interpretations. Lorena has cited Jelena Rozga as her favorite Croatian singer and someone she has listened to since a young age.

Discography

Singles

Notes

References

External links

2003 births
21st-century Croatian women singers
Croatian pop musicians
Croatian pop singers
Living people
Musicians from Split, Croatia